Boodikka is a character appearing in comic books published by DC Comics, and a member of the Green Lantern Corps. Her name is a play on the ancient British warrior-queen Boudica.

Publication history
Boodikka first appeared in Green Lantern (vol. 3) #20 and was created by Gerald Jones, Pat Broderick, Romeo Tanghal, Albert De Guzman, and Anthony Tollin.

Fictional character biography
At three centuries of age, the warrior Boodikka of the planet Bellatrix was originally recruited by the sphere-like Chaselon of Barrio III to join the then-reconstituted Green Lantern Corps. Boodikka had belonged to something called the "Bellatrix Bombers", a group of women mercenaries for hire by planets to clear the spaceways of hostile forces. The "Bellatrix Bombers" had broken up at some point, the majority of the team apparently having been killed along the way.

Initially Hal Jordan was dismayed and otherwise put off by Boodikka's inherently aggressive attitude. Despite this, Kilowog, a renowned trainer in the Corps and the trainer of Jordan himself, was only too eager to train someone so challenging and gave her his recommendation as a candidate. Things moved quickly at this point, and Boodikka soon found herself thrust into battle with Star Sapphire. She and the rest of the Corps joined in the fight against Hal's one-time love, the mercenary Flicker, and an entire Teban convoy.

Some time later, new recruits of the Green Lantern Corps were shown the Book of Oa, a book kept by the Guardians of the Universe which told tales of Green Lanterns past, present, and future. They learned stories which would help them be better Green Lanterns. The new members had this training disrupted when they went to Earth to help free Hal Jordan from the influence of the villain Eclipso. They were no match for the eclipsed Jordan and Star Sapphire. Eclipso managed to escape the Corps and soon they returned to Oa. Guy Gardner was awarded a ring by the Guardians of the Universe to act as temporary Green Lantern of Space Sector 2814.

She would quickly prove to be a skilled power ring wielder, a worthwhile addition to the Green Lantern Corps. Nevertheless, her problem with authority and authority figures posed a continuing problem. She was often at odds with Kreon of Tebis, another new recruit to the Corps. As the former Chieftain of the Teban battle fleet, he was used to discipline and military precision. Their infighting had even jeopardized Oa and the Guardians during a Qwardian invasion. Guy Gardner had returned to Oa to take the yellow power ring of Sinestro. Without Kilowog to guide them, the Green Lanterns were in chaos.

Kreon and Boodikka came to blows when the rival Green Lantern criticized her for being an undisciplined fighter. Running out of options, Kilowog brought the two squabbling Green Lanterns to John Stewart as a "guest lecturer" in cooperation and tolerance. Stewart performed a mind scan on the two recruits and somehow exchanged their consciousnesses. The two Green Lanterns were faced with their ultimate fears: Kreon's was represented by "Mama Denata" and his fear of the uncontrollable, while Boodikka's fear was "the Chain Men" which represented the suffocation she felt by authoritative restraints. The two had no choice but to learn to work together or be defeated.

Boodikka never lost her love of battle. She eagerly fought against the incarnation of Entropy, even though the encounter then-seemed to mean certain death. Boodikka proved to have come a long way as a Green Lantern, then working as a team with the other members of the Corps to defeat Entropy.

In a space sector far removed from our own galaxy, Boodikka was assigned to investigate the deaths of multiple alien races that had suddenly destroyed themselves in an apparent mass-suicide, environmental destruction, or otherwise massive wars. Upon arriving on a world in the midst of tearing itself apart, Boodikka encountered Guy Gardner. He and his colleagues, the "Gardners of the Universe", had been dispatched to solve the same problem as Boodikka. Guy sought to prove to his leadership abilities to his team of super-powered aliens from across known space. It was not long until Gardner got into an altercation with the Green Lantern. It was during this fight that Guy realized his yellow ring was powered by the energy of the Green Lanterns' power rings. Fully charged, Gardner's yellow power ring enabled him to recognize the true threat. Created in the anti-matter universe of Qward, his power ring negated the mental block of the real attackers. Gardner used his ring to free the others from their trance.

Boodikka's respite would not last long. An alien race called the Ophidians had come to cleanse known space. On two occasions in their sordid past they had been nearly annihilated by alien invaders – then since confining themselves to eradicating all other life in the universe to insure their pseudo-religious quest would never again be in harm's way. The Ophidians would entrance their victims before causing them to fight amongst themselves all the way to extinction. As the Ophidian ship managed to elude them, Boodikka and Gardner had to join their minds together to achieve the speed needed to overtake them. When they reached the ship, it exploded. Whether this was a result of feedback from the two fighting off the mind control or self-destruction, is unknown. The pair now had no way to find the Ophidian's homeworld. After the battle, Boodikka called upon the Guardians of the Universe to consult in the matter of recovering Gardner's Qwardian power ring. The Guardians, however, had determined Gardner was working toward the same ends they were. Although they would be watching Gardner, they decided not to act on Gardner for the time being.

A fierce warrior, Boodikka was well-versed in many combative arts including the use of short-swords, handguns, and explosives. Often she would visit her own mother for combat. On Bellatrix, this was considered a good time. Boodikka's own grandmother had been killed by her own daughter. Arisia, a former Green Lantern of Graxos IV and onetime love of Hal Jordan, told this story to Justice Leaguers Power Girl, Doctor Light, and Maya when they inquired about women in the Green Lantern Corps.

At one point the Green Lantern Corps were called upon to help Hal Jordan on the planet Maltus. He had been fighting the Maltusian gods known as the Triarch and was also under attack by the Darkstars and the L.E.G.I.O.N. Boodikka was as smitten by the fighting prowess of Lobo, bounty hunter and L.E.G.I.O.N. operative. The two stopped in mid-fight and went "somewhere" at Lobo's suggestion for a formidable love-making session that caused the two of them to miss the entire fight.

Boodikka eventually became a kind of recruiter for the Corps. In her search she encountered Barin, a young soldier of a kindred warrior species who she believed would prove to be an asset to her brethren. As events would turn out, Barin was not quite at a point where he was ready to fight solo. Upon his first outing alone he was quickly besieged by a kind of space mongrels and went into shock. The would-be Lantern was brought to Oa where he was connected to life support systems. Since the destruction of Oa by both the Parallax-ridden Hal Jordan and its resurrection by Kyle Rayner, Barin's ultimate fate remains unknown.

Emerald Twilight and beyond
Her next mission was to stop Hal Jordan from reaching Oa during Emerald Twilight by the direct order of the Guardians of the Universe. Although she fought well, she was no match for Jordan's willpower. Because she was unwilling to give up her ring freely, Jordan severed Boodikka's hand to take her ring from it. Jordan left her floating in space and continued on towards Oa where he would soon become Parallax. Jordan later mentioned that he had left Boodikka, along with the other Green Lanterns he had confronted on the way to Oa, with "enough power to survive" even after taking their rings.

Boodikka had survived, joining "The Brotherhood of the Cold Flame" on the planet Xudar with other former Green Lanterns to find the means to atone for the crimes of Hal Jordan. The Brotherhood of the Cold flame, using the spirit of the deceased Kilowog, created the "Dark Lantern", an instrument of their vengeance against Boodikka's wishes.

Boodikka was later discovered by Hal Jordan and Guy Gardner on the Manhunter homeworld of Biot, in a state of suspended animation with other "Lost Lanterns" Jordan had left for dead during Emerald Twilight. At some point in time the Manhunters, in concert with Hank Henshaw, had gathered up these former Green Lanterns, put them into suspended animation, and used their energies as a battery to create more advanced Manhunters. Upon being freed from her slumber Boodikka seemed shocked that she no longer had her hand, and following commentary implied her last conscious memory was of fighting the Parallax-possessed Hal Jordan despite having lived some time after her maiming on Xudar as part of the "Brotherhood of the Cold Flame". How or why Boodikka was captured while on Xudar (assuming she still remained there) remains unknown. During the confrontation with the Manhunters, Kreon dies and his ring chooses Boodikka. She resumes her duties in the Green Lantern Corps, replacing her lost hand with an emerald one fueled by her Power Ring energies.

Boodikka and her fellow Lost Lanterns keep their distance from Hal Jordan until Parallax (in the form of Kyle Rayner) brings him to Qward. They followed, knowing that "the Corps doesn't abandon its own". When Parallax killed Chance, she attempted to vaporise him, which her ring recognised as an illegal action, consequently shutting down, leaving her helpless. Boodikka then went with Ke'Haan and Laira to find Ion, deep beneath Qward. Instead, they run into the Anti-Monitor. Ke'Haan was killed, but the others managed to rescue Ion, and return to Oa. At the same time, the Guardians had rewritten the Book of Oa, allowing Lanterns to use lethal force, returning control of the ring to Boodikka.

Post-Sinestro Corps War

Boodikka became a member of the Alpha Lanterns, an internal policing force within the Corps itself, soon after the Sinestro War and the enactment of the Second Law of the Book of Oa. The Alpha Lanterns make sure that no Corps member performs an illegal action using a power ring. Each Alpha Lantern receives a second power ring and receives direct connections to the Book of Oa's Laws and the Central Power Battery. The process involves surgical alteration into a hybrid of the individual recruit's biological form and updated Manhunter technology. In other words, Alpha Lanterns are cyborgs.

Boodikka and the Alpha Lanterns are seen in Final Crisis. Fellow Alpha Lantern Kraken is revealed to be taken over by Granny Goodness during Hal Jordan's trial after the Alphas had arrested Hal for the murder of Orion.

Brightest Day
Alpha Lantern Boodikka is shown to have been controlled by Cyborg Superman. As she attacks Kyle Rayner, Soranik Natu, and John Stewart, Green Lantern member Hannu ambushes her and manages to damage her severely. This temporarily frees her from Cyborg Superman's control and she instructs the other Lanterns to recharge the battery with the energy she has absorbed. Her fellow Lanterns are able to repair her enough for her to fight, and she joins in the attack on the Cyborg Superman's base. During the battle, the Cyborg's body is destroyed, and his consciousness attempts to take control of Boodikka's body. Boodikka's consciousness fights back, defeating him. On her return to Oa, Boodikka is made a member of the Lantern Honor Guard, her emotions restored due to the way she was freed from the Cyborg's control. However, Ganthet noted immediately that there was something different about her. Boodikka asserts this is because Ganthet's newly discovered emotions allowed her to be who she is (Boodikka's true self, now in control of her body again), not what she is (an Alpha Lantern).

Reign of Doomsday
Boodikka later appears at the remains of the destroyed planet New Krypton, where she encounters Batman and Supergirl of the Justice League. Boodikka explains that the Guardians had sent her on a mission to survey the ruins as a follow-up to the initial Green Lantern Corps inspection of the planet that took place during the World of New Krypton storyline. Suddenly, the heroes are attacked by Doomsday, who strikes Boodikka across the back before she has a chance to react. Due to her injuries, Boodikka is unable to effectively wield her ring, and is nearly captured by the creature before being rescued by Supergirl. With Starman and Saint Walker of the Blue Lantern Corps serving as a distraction, Batman and Supergirl are able to get the injured Boodikka to the JLA Watchtower. Doomsday follows them aboard, and just as he is about to attack them, Cyborg Superman emerges from Boodikka's body and states that Doomsday attacked Boodikka and the JLA members in order to get to him.

After Doomsday captures Supergirl and Cyborg Superman and then flees the Watchtower, Starman mentions that Boodikka is healing herself in the JLA medical facility, and that she should soon have enough energy to return to Oa.

Following the War of the Green Lanterns storyline, Boodikka and the Alpha Lanterns are killed by Alpha Lantern Varix that believe that the Alpha Lanterns are being corrupted into judgement against John Stewart during his trial; Varix then killed himself. Afterwards, the bodies of Alpha Lanterns were interred on Oa.

In other media

Television
 Boodikka appears in the Duck Dodgers episode "The Green Loontern", voiced by Grey DeLisle. She helps defend Oa from Sinestro, and is later rescued by the Dodgers and the rest of the Corps.
 Boodikka makes a cameo in the Justice League Action episode "Watchtower Tours".

Film

 Boodikka appears in Green Lantern: First Flight, voiced by Tricia Helfer. This version is radically different from her comic version, in that she is a co-conspirator with Sinestro, and is ultimately killed in a fight with Hal Jordan and Kilowog.
 Boodikka has a cameo appearance in Green Lantern: Emerald Knights, voiced again by Grey DeLisle.
 Boodikka makes cameo appearances in the live-action Green Lantern film.

References

External links
  Unofficial Boodikka Biography
 A Character Profile, with a list of significant appearances

Comics characters introduced in 1992
DC Comics cyborgs
DC Comics aliens
DC Comics extraterrestrial superheroes
DC Comics female superheroes
Green Lantern Corps officers